Armed Forces Finance Authority is one of the Egyptian Ministry of Defence agencies.

Heads 
Brigade Staff of War / Mohammed Amin Nasr.
Brigade Staff of War / Anwar Mahmoud Nasr.
Brigade Staff of War / Hazem Fawzy.

Defence agencies of Egypt